The 2016 Lamborghini Super Trofeo season is the eighth season of the European Super Trofeo, the fourth season of the North American Super Trofeo and the fifth season of the Asian Super Trofeo. Every championship features six double-header rounds, with each race lasting for a duration of 50 minutes. 2016 marks the 2nd season of the Huracán LP620-2 Super Trofeo.

Super Trofeo Europe

Calendar

Entries

Results summary

Super Trofeo North America

Calendar

Entries

Results summary

Super Trofeo Asia

Calendar

Entries

Results summary

References

External links

2016 in motorsport
Lamborghini Super Trofeo seasons